William Williamson may refer to:

 William Williamson (American politician) (1875–1972), US Representative
 William Williamson (Australian politician) (1867–1950)
 William Crawford Williamson (1816–1895), English naturalist
 William D. Williamson (1779–1846), American, Governor of Maine, US Representative
 William Price Williamson (1884–1918), American officer in the U.S. Navy
 William Williamson (canoeist) (1915–1991), Canadian canoeist
 William Richard Williamson (1872–1958), English adventurer and oil company representative
 William Williamson (priest, born 1697) (1697–1765), Anglican priest in Ireland, Archdeacon of Kildare
 William Williamson (priest, born 1645) (1645–1722), Irish Anglican priest, Archdeacon of Glendalough
 Willie Williamson, college football coach
 Bill Williamson (1922–1979), Australian jockey
 Bill Williamson (footballer) (1887–1918), English footballer

See also
 Billy Williamson (disambiguation)
 Williamson (surname)
 Williamson (disambiguation)